The 1912 Maryland Aggies football team was an American football team that represented Maryland Agricultural College (which became Maryland State College in 1916 and part of the University of Maryland in 1920) as an independent during the 1912 college football season. In their second season under head coach Curley Byrd, the Aggies compiled a 6–1–1 record and outscored all opponents by a total of 191 to 60.

Halfback Hoffecker was the team captain.

Schedule

References

Maryland
Maryland Terrapins football seasons
Maryland Aggies football